Atul Naraindas Khatri is an Indian stand-up comedian and YouTube personality. He was rated among the top Indian comedians by CNN-IBN and was the only Indian to perform in the Hong Kong International Comedy Festival (Sep 2014). He was also the winner of the CEO's Got Talent Season 1.

Early life and education
He attended the St. Theresa’s Boys High School and later obtained a Bachelor of Engineering degree from TSEC, University of Mumbai. He also attained a certificate in Business Administration from the Manchester Business School in Manchester, England.

His family is Sindhi and his mother hails from Karachi.

After completing his education, he joined his family-run computer business (Kaytek Computer Services Private Limited) and assumed the post of Chief Executive Officer. At the age of 43, Khatri became a comedian whilst still being engaged in his business.

Career
Khatri in 2011, owing to monotony and after being encouraged by his wife to do so, wanted to have an alternate career. He initially wanted to take up courses and become a bartender and then later a disc jockey but did not pursue either field. He started by posting jokes on Facebook and later became a stand-up comedian. He became notable after winning the "CEO's Got Talent" award by FremantleMedia. Khatri has done over 400 comedy shows, television advertisements and YouTube videos. Khatri was also one of the three finalists at the Melbourne International Comedy Festival held in Delhi in 2012.

Khatri performs at The Comedy Store and the Canvas Laugh Factory, and with East India Comedy. He also performed in San Francisco for a fundraiser organized by American India Foundation.

East India Comedy
Khatri joined EIC which was founded by Sorabh Pant in 2012 and is one of the busiest comedy groups in India. In 2017, both Pant and Khatri left EIC to focus on their individual careers.

Commercials
Khatri has appeared in television advertisements for Amazon, Muthoot Finance, Rebtel, Aegon Religare Insurance, Philips, and Matrix SIM card.

References

External links
East India Comedy

Living people
Indian male comedians
Sindhi people
Indian people of Sindhi descent
Indian stand-up comedians
Artists from Mumbai
University of Mumbai alumni
Year of birth missing (living people)